Robert James "Red" Burnett (1910 or 1911 – April 1, 1979) was a Canadian sports journalist. A columnist for the Toronto Star, he won the Elmer Ferguson Memorial Award in 1984 and is a member of the media section of the Hockey Hall of Fame. Burnett joined the Star in 1927 originally as a copy boy, and retired in 1975. He died of a heart attack in 1979 at the age of 68. At the time of his death, he had returned to the Star to work as a copy editor as part-time job.

References

1910s births
1979 deaths
Canadian sports journalists
Elmer Ferguson Award winners
Toronto Star people